This is a list of number one singles on the Billboard Japan Hot 100 chart in Japan in 2014. The week's most popular songs in Japan, ranked by the Hanshin Corporation and based on radio airplay measured by Plantech and sales data as compiled by SoundScan Japan.

Chart history

References

External links 
 Japan Hot 100 on billboard-japan.com by Hanshin Contents Link
 Japan Hot 100 2014 archive on Billboard.com

2014 in Japanese music
Japan Hot 100
Lists of number-one songs in Japan